The following is the final results of the 1982 World Wrestling Championships. Freestyle competition were held in Edmonton, Alberta, Canada and Greco-Roman competition were held in Katowice, Poland.

Medal table

Team ranking

Medal summary

Men's freestyle

Men's Greco-Roman

References
FILA Database

World Wrestling Championships
W
W
W
1982 in Polish sport
1982 in Canadian sports